Charlie Craggs (born 1992) is a British transgender actress, activist, and author from London.

Craggs was born on a council estate in Ladbroke Grove, West London. She later attended the London College of Fashion. Growing up, Craggs struggled with gender dysphoria, but seeing Nadia Almada win the fifth series of Big Brother in 2004 helped her understand that it was possible to transition.

In 2013, Craggs launched her "Nail Transphobia" campaign which provided free manicures to people, allowing them to chat with a trans person about their experiences, in an attempt to reduce transphobia. The campaign began as a university project and grew to become a pop-up salon that appeared at different events and locations. The impact of the campaign was recognized in 2015 when Craggs was number 40 in The Independent newspaper's 2015 "Rainbow List" of the 101 most Influential LGBTI people in the UK and again in 2016 when she led the 2016 "New Radicals" list compiled by Nesta and The Observer newspaper.

In 2017 Craggs published her first book, To My Trans Sisters, a collection of letters by successful trans women. In 2018 the book was a finalist in the 30th Lambda Literary Awards.

Craggs began a campaign in 2018 for inclusion of a transgender rainbow flag emoji in Unicode, which was subsequently included in 2020.

In 2021, Craggs fronted the BBC Three documentary Transitioning Teens about transgender teenagers waiting to be seen by the NHS regarding their transitions. The doc was released on BBC iPlayer.

In 2022, Craggs landed one of the leading roles in the Doctor Who spin-off podcast Doctor Who: Redacted, making Craggs the second transgender companion in the show's history. The BBC Sounds podcast was created and written by Juno Dawson and features Jodie Whittaker in her role as the Thirteenth Doctor.

Filmography

Audio

References

British human rights activists
English LGBT rights activists
Transgender writers
Writers from London
Living people
21st-century LGBT people
1992 births